is a passenger railway station located in the town of Kamikawa, Saitama, Japan, operated by East Japan Railway Company (JR East).

Lines

Station layout
The station consists of two side platforms serving two tracks, which form a passing loop on the single-track line. Platform two is connected to the station building by a footbridge. The station is unattended.

Platforms

History
The station opened on 1 July 1931.

Passenger statistics
In fiscal 2010, the station was used by an average of 269 passengers daily (boarding passengers only).

Surrounding area
Kamikawa Town Hall]
Tanshō Post Office

See also
 List of railway stations in Japan

References

External links

 JR East Station information 

Railway stations in Japan opened in 1931
Stations of East Japan Railway Company
Railway stations in Saitama Prefecture
Hachikō Line
Kamikawa, Saitama